High School is a 1968 American documentary film by Frederick Wiseman that shows a typical day for students and faculty at a Pennsylvanian high school during the late 1960s. It is one of the first direct cinema (or cinéma vérité) documentaries. It was shot over five weeks between March and April 1968 at Northeast High School in Philadelphia, Pennsylvania. The film was not shown in Philadelphia at the time of its release, because of Wiseman's concerns over what he called "vague talk" of a lawsuit.

The film was released in November 1968. High School has aired on PBS. Wiseman distributes his work (DVDs and 16mm prints) through Zipporah Films, which rents them to high schools, colleges, and libraries on a five-year long-term lease. High School was selected in 1991 for preservation in the National Film Registry.

In 1994, Wiseman released High School II, a second documentary on high school, based on Central Park East Secondary School in New York City.

Reception and interpretation
Film critic David Denby, writing in the New York Review of Books, described High School as "a savagely comic portrait" of an urban high school in a period of emerging social unrest:

In his review for The A.V. Club, A.A. Dowd wrote that High School “is filthy with the kind of revealing behavior that a documentarian can only hope and pray to capture on camera”, concluding:

See also
List of American films of 1968
List of films preserved in the United States National Film Registry

References

Ellsworth, Liz. Frederick Wiseman: A Guide to References and Resources. Boston, MA: G.K.Hall & Co., 1979. 
Grant, Barry Keith. "Five films by Frederick Wiseman" University of California Press, 2006. 
Rosenthal, Alan. The New Documentary In Action: A Casebook in Film Making. Berkeley, CA: University of California Press, 1971.

External links
High School essay by Barry Grant on the National Film Registry website. 
High School essay by Daniel Eagan in America's Film Legacy: The Authoritative Guide to the Landmark Movies in the National Film Registry, A&C Black, 2010 , pages 637-639 
Comma, Space: Frederick Wiseman's "High School" (1968) essay by Craig Keller

High School on Kanopy.

1968 films
American documentary films
Documentary films about high school in the United States
Films directed by Frederick Wiseman
Documentary films about Philadelphia
United States National Film Registry films
1968 documentary films
1960s teen films
1960s high school films
Education in Philadelphia
1960s English-language films
1960s American films
English-language documentary films